Simone Avelli (born 6 May 2000) is a field hockey player from Chile, who plays as a midfielder.

Career

Junior national team
Simone Avelli made her debut for the Chile U–21 team in 2021, during a test series against India in Santiago. Following her debut, Avelli was named in the Chile team for the Pan American Junior Championship, also in Santiago.

Las Diablas
Prior to her debut for the junior national team, Avelli made her first appearce for Las Diablas in early 2020, during a test series against Japan in Santiago.

References

External links

2000 births
Living people
Chilean female field hockey players
Female field hockey midfielders
21st-century Chilean women